Hesperia is a peer-reviewed journal published quarterly by the American School of Classical Studies at Athens. It was founded in 1932 for the publication of the work of the school, which was previously published in the American Journal of Archaeology. This is still the main aim of the journal today. It also accepts other submissions by scholars in the fields of Greek archaeology, art, epigraphy, history, and literature.

References

External links 
 Hesperia on the American School of Classical Studies at Athens website
 Hesperia on JSTOR (1932-2004)
 Hesperia on Wilson OmniFile (2004-present)
 Hesperia on Project Muse (2005)

Publications established in 1932
Archaeology journals
Classics journals
Quarterly journals
English-language journals